Ruila Nature Reserve is a nature reserve which is located in Harju County, Estonia.

The area of the nature reserve is 831 ha.

The protected area was founded in 2005 to protect valuable habitat types and threatened species in Pohla, Ruila, Mõnuste and Allika village (all in former Kernu Parish).

References

Nature reserves in Estonia
Geography of Harju County